DTI DATA Recovery is 
a data recovery company with cleanrooms located in New York and Florida, specifically in St Petersburg, Tampa, and Orlando.  Founded in 1998 by David Mohyla who previously authored the digital program "Hard Disk Tech Specs" and "Disk Assist." In addition to recovering hard drives and RAID arrays, they also have a number of free and recovery software.

See also
 List of data recovery software
 List of data recovery companies

References

External links 
 DTI Data Hard Drive Recovery Company website
Data recovery companies
Companies based in Manhattan
Companies based in St. Petersburg, Florida
Companies based in Tampa, Florida
Companies based in Orlando, Florida